There are numerous Communities in Newport Beach. These include:

Newport Beach communities

Central Newport Beach communities
 Big Canyon
 East Bluff
 Harbor View
 Newport Shores
 Dover Shores
 Bay Shores
 Lido Village
 Promontory Point
 Bonita Canyon
 Port Streets
 One Ford Road
 Belcourt, Newport Beach
 Harbor Ridge, Newport Beach

Coastal Newport Bay communities

 Balboa Peninsula, Newport Beach
 Newport Heights, Newport Beach
 Lido Isle, Newport Beach

Newport Beach Islands
 Balboa Island, Newport Beach
 Bay Island, Newport Beach
 Collins Island, Newport Beach
 Harbor Island, Newport Beach
 Linda Isle, Newport Beach
 Newport Island, Newport Beach

Coastal Newport Beach communities

 Corona del Mar, Newport Beach
 Newport Coast, Newport Beach

Inland Newport Beach communities
 San Joaquin Hills, Newport Beach
 Santa Ana Heights, California

See also
 Upper Newport Bay
 Newport Back Bay

References

Newport Beach, California